The 1971 Anglo-Italian Cup was the second staging of the annual association football tournament. It featured twelve teams — six from England and six from Italy.

The competition started on 26 May 1971  and concluded on 12 June 1971 with Blackpool beating Bologna 2–1 in the final.

Details
The twelve teams were divided into three groups of four teams — two from England and two from Italy. Each team plays the two foreign teams twice, home and away. The teams are then ranked against teams in their own country in a league, and the top-ranked teams from each country play off in a final for the trophy.

Participating teams

England
Blackpool
Crystal Palace
Huddersfield Town
Stoke City
Swindon Town
West Brom

Italy
Bologna
Cagliari
Inter Milan
Roma
Sampdoria
Verona

Group results

Group 1

Group 2

Group 3

Final rankings

Total points are determined by points gained plus goals scored. (NB: two points for a win).

English rankings

Italian rankings

Final

References

RSSSF Page

Anglo-Italian Cup
Anglo-Italian Cup
1971